Emoz Alyaz may refer to:

 Emoz Alyaz , India
 Artabuynk, Armenia
 Yeghegis, Armenia
 Yanıq Alayaz, Azerbaijan
 Yuxarı Alayaz, Azerbaijan